Ip Man is a 2013 Chinese television series romanticizing the life of Ip Man (Mandarin: Ye Wen), a Chinese martial artist specialising in Wing Chun.

Background
Directed by Fan Xiaotian, the series starred Kevin Cheng, who briefly appeared as a younger Ip Man in Ip Man: The Final Fight (2013) which starred Anthony Wong as a middle-aged Ip Man. Han Xue, Liu Xiaofeng, Chrissie Chau, Song Yang, Yu Rongguang, Yuen Wah and Bruce Leung were cast in supporting roles. Wilson Yip, the director of the Ip Man film series (starring Donnie Yen), and Taiwanese television series producer Young Pei-pei served as the artistic consultants. The real-life Ip Man's sons, Ip Chun and Ip Ching, were invited to be the martial arts consultants for the series. The series was shot from July to November 2012 in Kunshan, Suzhou, and was first aired on Shandong TV from 24 February to 9 March 2013. It won the Golden Eagle Award for Best Television Series in 2012.

Cast

 Kevin Cheng as Ip Man
 Zhou Jianan as Ye Wen (young)
 Han Xue as Zhang Yongcheng
 Liu Xiaofeng as Lin Qingshan
 Zang Zhizhong as Lin Qingshan (young)
 Chrissie Chau as Jenny
 Song Yang as Si
 Han Zhenhua as Ye Wen's father
 Zhang Ruijia as Ye Wen's mother
 Chen Hongjin as Ye Zhun
 Yu Rongguang as Yu Fengjiu
 Yuen Wah as Chen Huashun
 Bruce Leung as Liang Bi
 Bryan Leung as Master Hong
 Jiang Kai as Fu Zhengyun
 Yu Hai as Tong Zhanpeng
 Kou Zhenhai as Zhang Yintang
 Pu Chaoying as landlady
 Liu Yajin as postman
 Liu Xianchen as Zhang Yongsheng
 Yuan Bingyan as Qiu Jianyun
 Xu Xiangdong as Jiang Sheng
 Li Qingxiang as Lu Changyi
 Liu Hailong as Yan Chunlai
 Wang Weiguo as Marshal Zhu
 Mou Fengbin as Guimen Longyi / Guimen Long'er
 Yu Yankai as Brother Lu
 Yang Qianli as Yan Dong
 Zhou Zhong as Mo Renchao

Production
There was fierce competition among many companies over the rights to the production of a television series about Ip Man since Wilson Yip's movies Ip Man and Ip Man 2 (starring Donnie Yen) came into the limelight. Around June 2012, Suzhou Funa Films and Television acquired the rights to produce the television series. Fan Xiaotian, who previously directed many Chinese television series, was selected as the director, while Hong Kong screenwriter Charcoal Tan was chosen to write the script. Wilson Yip and Taiwanese producer Young Pei-pei served as artistic consultants while the real-life Ip Man's sons, Ip Chun and Ip Ching, were invited to be martial arts consultants for the series.

Shooting for Ip Man began in July 2012 and finalized in around November.

After the release of Ip Man, BBC UKChina conducted a telephone interview with Fan Xiaotian about the television series. Fan mentioned that the earlier Ip Man films were too short, and that his purpose in creating the television series was to present a more developed and lively story about Ip Man which allows audiences to explore the character in greater depth. He also felt it was a very opportune time to produce a television series about Ip Man because Wilson Yip's Ip Man movies were very successful and influential, and also because Wong Kar-wai was making The Grandmaster when Ip Man (TV series) was in production.

Fan Xiaotian and Young Pei-pei were keen on recruiting actor Vincent Zhao, who has a background in martial arts, to play the lead character. Taking some netizens' opinions and suggestions into account, the production team also considered casting Han Geng, Wu Chun, Wallace Chung and Wallace Huo in the series. However, the role of Ip Man eventually went to Hong Kong TVB artiste Kevin Cheng. Han Xue was chosen to portray Ip Man's wife Cheung Wing-sing (Mandarin: Zhang Yongcheng). Other cast members include Liu Xiaofeng, Chrissie Chau, Yu Rongguang, Yuen Wah, Bruce Leung, Song Yang and Kou Zhenhai.

In September 2012, the cast and crew of Ip Man appeared at a publicity event in Suzhou to promote the television series.

Broadcasts

Home Media

The full Ip Man series is available in Mandarin, with Mandarin subtitles, on popular free video streaming sites in the US.

The first ten episodes of this 50 episode series was released by Cinedigm in North American, on DVD and Blu-ray on October 10, 2017. The 45 minute episodes feature Mandarin audio with English subtitles.

See also
 The Legend Is Born – Ip Man

References

External links
  Ip Man (TV series) official page on Sina.com

2013 Chinese television series debuts
Martial arts television series
TVB dramas
Television shows set in Guangdong
Cultural depictions of Ip Man
Chinese period television series
Chinese action television series